Green Swamp Wilderness Preserve is a 110,000 acre preserve in the four-corner area of Lake County, Pasco County, Polk County and Sumter County, east of Dade City, Florida. It includes a 36-mile section of the Withlacoochee River and offers hiking trails. It is managed by the Southwest Florida Water Management District. It includes various habitats and is home to a wide array of wildlife. The preserve is divided into five areas: 5,067 acre Colt Creek State Park, the 51,149 acre East Tract; the 11,052 acre Hampton Tract; the 4,446 acre Little Withlacoochee Tract; and the 37,350 acre West Tract.

In 1974, 322,000 acres of the Green Swamp region were designated an Area of Critical State Concern.
Purchases began in the early 1970s and are ongoing.

External links
 Florida Nature Coast - Pasco County - Green Swamp West Tract Visitor's information (includes short video tour)

References

Southwest Florida Water Management District reserves
Protected areas of Pasco County, Florida
Protected areas of Lake County, Florida
Protected areas of Polk County, Florida
Protected areas of Sumter County, Florida